Palamedu is a panchayat town in Madurai district, Indian state of Tamil Nadu

Geography
It has an average elevation of 227 metres (744 feet)

Demographics
 India census, Palamedu had a population of 8187. Males constitute 50% of the population and females 50%. Palamedu has an average literacy rate of 62%, higher than the national average of 59.5%: male literacy is 69%, and female literacy is 54%. In Palamedu, 12% of the population is under 6 years of age.

Politics
It is part of the Madurai (Lok Sabha constituency). S. Venkatesan also known as  Su. Venkatesan from CPI(M) is the Member of Parliament, Lok Sabha, after his election in the 2019 Indian general election.

This area is in the Madurai West (state assembly constituency).

Economy

Palamedu has a moderate monsoon climate condition. People in this area are mainly cultivating 'Guava', 'Ground nut', 'Sugar Cane', 'Paddy (Rice)', etc.
More number of people are engaged in producing dairy products. Milk is supplied to all over the Southern parts of Tamil Nadu.

References

https://www.palamedujallikattu.com

Cities and towns in Madurai district